Íomhaor mac Tighearnán Mág Tighearnán (anglicised Ivor McKiernan) was chief of the McKiernan Clan and Baron or Lord of Tullyhunco barony, County Cavan from 1258 until his death c.1269.

Ancestry

Íomhaor was the son of Tighearnán who was son of Duarcán, son of Íomhaor, son of Gíolla Chríost, son of Amhlaoibh, son of Tighearnán, the eponym.

Chieftainship

On the death of the previous chief, Macraith Mág Tighearnán, Íomhaor took the chieftaincy and resided in the castle of Croaghan of the Cups, now in the townland of Coolnashinny, besides the modern town of Killeshandra. Macraith had been killed in 1258 by Domnall O'Ruairc (son of Conchobar son of Tigernán), king of Breifne from 1258 to 1258, and the McKiernans soon took their revenge. Royal Inauguration in Gaelic Ireland C. 1100-1600: A Cultural Landscape Study
By Elizabeth FitzPatrick, p. 212

References

Irish lords
1269 deaths
People from County Cavan
13th-century Irish people